Sròn is the Scottish Gaelic word for nose and is the name of some hills in the Scottish Highlands. Before the abolition of the acute accent in Scottish Gaelic, it was sometimes spelt as srón.

The name "sròn" is often applied to pointed hills or promontories that form the edge of a mountain massive, giving the appearance of a nose-like ridge. As such, they are often not the highest hilltops; in fact only one of the 282 Munros is called Sròn: Sròn a' Choire Ghairbh ("the nose of the rough corrie"), located west of Loch Lochy.

Sròn also appears in names of towns (often anglicized as Stron), such as Strontian (Sròn an t-Sìtheinn), the nose of the fairies (Sìth), and Stranraer, (An t-Sròn Reamhar) the  fat nose.

Scottish Gaelic language
Geography of Scotland